Kyōto 3rd district (京都府第3区 Kyōto-fu dai-san-ku or simply 京都3区 Kyōto sanku) is a constituency of the House of Representatives in the Diet of Japan. It is located in South central Kyoto and consists of Kyoto city's Fushimi ward, the cities of Mukō and Nagaokakyō and the town of Ōyamazaki. As of 2012, 345,260 eligible voters were registered in the district.

Before the electoral reform of 1994, the area formed part of Kyōto 2nd district where five Representatives had been elected by single non-transferable vote (SNTV).

Kyoto had been a traditional stronghold of the Japanese Communist Party (JCP); but following the electoral reform that replaced the SNTV multi-member districts with FPTP single-member districts, the 3rd district was the only one in Kyōto the JCP could win: Iwao Teramae was one of only two JCP candidates countrywide to win a district seat under the new system in the 1996 general election (the other being Kenjirō Yamahara in Kōchi 1st district). After Teramae's retirement in the 2000 election, Liberal Democrat Shigehiko Okuyama who had narrowly lost to Teramae in ’96 won the district in 2000 when the center-left to left vote was split between a Communist, a Social Democrat and a Democrat. In three following elections, the Social Democratic Party did not nominate a candidate and the Communist vote share dropped below 20 percent and since 2003, Democrat Kenta Izumi won the 3rd district three times. In 2012, Izumi lost the district by 216 votes to 31-year-old Liberal Democratic newcomer Kensuke Miyazaki. In 2016, Miyazaki resigned because of a personal scandal and Izumi regained his seat in the subsequent by-elections.

Areas Covered

Current District 
As of 5 January 2023, the areas covered by this district are as follows:

 Fushimi-ku
 Mukō
 Nagaokakyō
 Otokuni District

List of representatives

Election results

References 

Politics of Kyoto Prefecture
Districts of the House of Representatives (Japan)